Northside College Preparatory High School (commonly referred to as Northside College Prep, Northside Prep, NCP, or simply Northside) is a public 4-year selective enrollment high school located in the North Park neighborhood on the north side of Chicago, Illinois, United States. Founded in 1999, it was the first new CPS high school to be built in 20 years. It is a selective enrollment school, and teaches only at the Honors and AP levels (excluding the P.E. department).

In 2014, it was ranked #3 in the nation by Newsweek. The school's establishment, part of former Chicago Mayor Richard M. Daley's plan to reinvent the city's public school system, generated controversy in the city and in the education community. The facilities were built with a $52.5 million budget that critics said could have better served other schools in city.

History
Founded in 1999, it was the first new Chicago Public School (CPS) high school to be built in 20 years. It is a selective enrollment school, and teaches only at the Honors and AP levels (excluding the P.E. department). Northside has earned a reputation for academic excellence, and has been consistently ranked as the #1 high school in Illinois.

The school's establishment, part of former Chicago Mayor Richard M. Daley's plan to reinvent the city's public school system, generated controversy in the city and in the education community. The facilities were built with a $52.5 million budget that critics said could have better served other schools in city.

Admission
Admission to Northside Prep follows the selective enrollment application system. Factors considered in the application include a student's grades from 7th grade, standardized test scores, entrance exam scores, and socio-economic status.  For the 2018–19 school year, 480 students were eligible for the Free Lunch Program.

Demographics
The demographic breakdown by race/ethnicity of the students enrolled for the 2019–2020 school year was:

College admissions and rankings
Northside College Prep is well known for the success of its students in the college admissions process, with over a quarter of the senior class gaining admission to the nation's top universities. Over 99% of the graduating senior class matriculates to college. In addition, the student body as a whole earns a large amount of financial aid from various sources.

In 2018 Northside was rated #2 in Illinois and #82 in the nation by U.S. News & World Report
In 2016 Northside was rated the #8 high school in the nation by "Newsweek" 
In 2014 Northside was rated the #3 high school in the nation by "Newsweek" 
In 2013 Northside was rated #1 in Illinois and #33 in the nation by U.S. News & World Report
In 2011 Northside was rated #1 in Illinois and #24 in the nation by Newsweek
In 2013 Northside was rated the #2 public high school in the nation by "The Best Schools"

Curriculum/scheduling and colloquium
With the exception of physical education classes, all courses in Northside are either Honors or (AP) (Advanced Placement). Northside has 24 advanced placement classes. Northside's math program is unique from most other high schools in that it uses the Interactive Mathematics Program, also known as IMP, instead of a traditional math track. IMP is very writing based, with students writing portfolios and projects instead of simply solving mathematical equations. Aside from four IMP courses, Northside also offers College Math, AP Statistics, AP Calculus BC, AP Calculus AB, Multi-Variable Calculus, Linear Algebra, and Differential Equations.

Northside also offers special education services for incoming students with diagnosed disabilities. The school's Office of Specialized Services helps to arrange appropriate accommodations. Given its extremely competitive academic environment, Northside successfully lobbied the Chicago Board of Education to eliminate class rankings. This effort was led by former principal Dr. James Lalley.

Northside's classes run on a block schedule. Classes meet twice a week: on Mondays and Thursdays or Tuesdays and Fridays. The school day used to start at 8:16 a.m. and ended at 3:30 p.m. until the 2014–15 school year when the school day at Northside now starts at 8:00 a.m. and now ends at 3:04 p.m. (except for Colloquium schedule where it ends at 3:01 p.m.). Each block is 100 minutes long with an 8 minute passing period between blocks. Wednesdays are reserved for an approximately three-hour non-credit class on five-day weeks called Colloquium. Dozens of colloquia are offered, with a wide range of interest such as motorcycle repair, computers, robotics, consumer-education, sewing, quilting, art, photography, paper craft, and Asian calligraphy, and each relates to one specific theme that changes every year. Classes are chosen by students twice a year (every semester, or otherwise it is year-long); availability is dependent on popularity and student's year ranking: seniors get first pick, then juniors, sophomores, and lastly freshmen; all of this is done online, through sound programming, with student portals opening at 7 am for students to start registering. There are different dates for different year students. These are the only classes in which students either pass or fail. Colloquium clubs vary from year to year.

After colloquium on Wednesdays, Northside College Prep has X and Y block classes. X and Y block classes are classes that students re-pick every week that will help them most that specific week. For instance if a student needs help in math homework they can choose a math tutoring class for either their X or Y block that week (each block used to be about 50 minutes long until the 2014–15 school year where now X and Y are 60 minutes long). Northside recently implemented and utilizes online student programming, in which students access and select their schedules through internet programming for both classes and colloquium. Courses for the upcoming school year are programmed at the end of the first semester of the current school year.

Sustainability
In the summer of 2010, Northside installed a 105-panel solar thermal system on the southern half of its roof. These solar panels work to heat the school's pool and have the capacity to provide hot water to the entire school.  This project was head by Northside science teacher Mr. Mike Coy, and Alexandra Rojek, Northside's 2011 valedictorian.

Located behind the school is the Joy Garden, a continuation of Northside's efforts to become a more sustainable institution. The Joy Garden is 10,000 square feet and situated adjacent to the eastern front of the building. It was built entirely through the efforts of students with the help of Urban Habitat Chicago. The garden is equipped with the latest in green technology, including a self-sustainable storm water management system and permeable concrete. However, it is more than just ecologically functional and friendly. This garden was built with a particular emphasis on providing a stimulating environment for special needs students. It extends from a traditional garden environment to one that is accessible to all students.

Athletics
Northside competes in the Chicago Public League (CPL) and is a member of the Illinois High School Association (IHSA). The Boy's Varsity Cross Country Team won the IHSA Regional title in 2008 and was the City Champion in 2009. The Boy's Varsity Track and Field Team won the IHSA Sectional Title in 2013 and 2016. The Girl's Varsity Cross Country Team won the IHSA Regional title in 2011, 2015, 2016, and 2020. The Girls Varsity Cross Country Team won the IHSA Sectional Title in 2016. The Girl's Varsity Cross Country Team was the City Champion in 2014, 2015, 2016, and 2017. The Girl's Varsity Track and Field Team won the IHSA Sectional Title in 2012. In 2016, under Coach Jon Gordon, the Northside College Prep Varsity Women Cross Country Team became the only CPS School to ever finish in the Top 6 in the State Cross Country Championships. The girl's varsity softball team were regional champions in 2011–12, 2012–13; and became the city champion. In 2013, The girls' varsity volleyball finished first in their conference (Red North).  Pom-Pons team placed 1st in the Chicago Public Schools (CPS) city championship and placed 2nd in the IDTA state competition in 2013. Girls Swimming CPS city champions tie with Lane Tech in 2012 and champions in 2014. Boys Swimming CPS champions 2016 and 2017. In 2018, Northside formed its first Women's Badminton team, winning 1st place in Doubles, and finishing 2nd overall as a team in the very first CPS City Championship. 
Sports Offerings:

Fall:
Cross Country
Men's and Women's Golf
Men's Soccer
Men's 16" Softball
Women's Swimming/Diving
Women's Tennis
Women's Volleyball
Winter:
Men's and Women's Basketball
Men's and Women's Bowling
Cheerleading
Chess
Pom-Pons
Men's Swimming/Diving
Wrestling
Spring:
Women's Badminton
Baseball
Men's and Women's Lacrosse
Women's Soccer
Women's Softball
Men's Tennis
Men's and Women's Track & Field
Men's Volleyball
Men's and Women's Water Polo

Notable alumni
 Miss Alex White - musician 
 Eve Ewing - author, poet, and sociologist 
 Minhal Baig - film writer and director

References

External links
 
 Profile from CPS
 Best High Schools: The Public Elites - Newsweek America's Best High Schools - MSNBC.com
 2007 U.S. News & World Report Gold Medal Listing of America's 100 Best High Schools
 Academic Decathlon Win
 About the Selective Enrollment process

Magnet schools in Illinois
Educational institutions established in 1999
Public high schools in Chicago
1999 establishments in Illinois
North Park, Chicago